Jean Sony Alcénat (born 23 January 1986), nicknamed Tiga, is a Haitian former professional footballer who played as a right-back.

Club career

Aigle Noir and Leixões
Alcénat was born in Port-au-Prince. In his country, he represented Aigle Noir AC. In January 2009 he moved to Portugal and signed for Leixões SC, making his Primeira Liga debut on 1 February in a 0–0 away draw against C.D. Nacional (one minute played) and finishing his first season with ten appearances – nine as a substitute – as the Matosinhos team finally ranked sixth, narrowly missing out on qualification to the UEFA Europa League.

Alcénat was much more regularly used in the 2009–10 campaign, but Leixões were relegated.

Rio Ave
In September 2011, Alcénat joined another club in the country, Rio Ave F.C. also of the top flight, making his debut on the 19th in a 2–3 home defeat to Sporting CP and being sent off in the 75th minute after two yellow cards. He played his second official game for the Vila do Conde side on 16 October, against U.D. Sousense in the third round of the Portuguese Cup, and again received his marching orders after a second bookable offence; both teams finished with nine players, in an eventual 5–2 win for hosts Rio Ave.

Romania
On 22 June 2012, Alcénat signed a two-year contract with Romanian team FC Petrolul Ploiești. Three years later, as his contract was due to expire and with his club facing insolvency, he joined FC Steaua București in the same the country.

Feirense
On 18 August 2016, Alcénat agreed to a two-year deal with Portugal's C.D. Feirense.

Career statistics

Club

International
Scores and results list Haiti's goal tally first, score column indicates score after each Alcénat goal.

Honours
Aigle Noir
Ligue Haïtienne: 2006 F

Petrolul Ploiești
Cupa României: 2012–13

References

External links

1986 births
Living people
Sportspeople from Port-au-Prince
Haitian footballers
Association football defenders
Haiti international footballers
2007 CONCACAF Gold Cup players
2013 CONCACAF Gold Cup players
2014 Caribbean Cup players
2015 CONCACAF Gold Cup players
Copa América Centenario players
Ligue Haïtienne players
Aigle Noir AC players
Primeira Liga players
Liga Portugal 2 players
Leixões S.C. players
Rio Ave F.C. players
C.D. Feirense players
Liga I players
FC Petrolul Ploiești players
FC Steaua București players
FC Voluntari players
FK Ventspils players
Haitian expatriate footballers
Haitian expatriate sportspeople in Portugal
Expatriate footballers in Portugal
Haitian expatriate sportspeople in Romania
Expatriate footballers in Romania
Haitian expatriate sportspeople in Latvia
Expatriate footballers in Latvia